The Ordo Secreta Sapientiae (Order of Secret Wisdom 1886 - 1898) was one of several initiatory Rosicrucian orders that developed during the Victorian magical revival, alongside such groups as the Hermetic Order of the Golden Dawn and the Aurum Solis.  Its early membership consisted of former members of Kenneth MacKenzies's Societas Rosicruciana in Anglia (SRIA) and students of Frederick Hockley, who died in 1885 and passed on many of his papers  It is quite probable that the initiatory structure of the Ordo Secreta Sapientiae was borrowed from the SRIA, which was in turn borrowed from the German "Order of the Golden and Rosy Cross".  The focus of the Secreta Sapientiae was in excavating secret pagan symbolism buried within the art of Christian Europe, which they, and others, believed could be found in its painting and architecture.  Never achieving the fame of its contemporaries, the Ordo Secreta Sapientiae was dissolved in 1898, and its members began drifting into the orbit of the Golden Dawn, just as that organization was beginning to fracture

References 

Rosicrucianism